Moji Afolayan (born 5 February 1968) is a Nigerian actress, filmmaker, producer, and director.

Early life
Afolayan hails from Agbamu, a town in Irepodun Local Government area of Kwara State southwestern Nigeria but grew up in Lagos State. She was born in an acting family, the first daughter of the late veteran actor and producer Ade Love who is also the father of  Kunle Afolayan and Gabriel Afolayan.

Afoloyan attended Coker Primary School at Orile Iganmu, a city in Lagos State south-western Nigeria before she proceeded to Esie Iludun Anglican School where she obtained the West Africa School certificate. She later attended Oyo State College of Education where she was trained as a school teacher.

Film career
In 2016, Afolayan who has acted in several Nigerian movies starred opposite Ojopagogo and Dele Odule in the Yoruba film Arinjo.

Personal life
She is married to Rasaq Olasunkanmi Olayiwola, a Nigerian actor popularly known by his stage name, "Ojopagogo".

Awards and nominations

See also
List of Yoruba people
 List of Nigerian film producers

References

Living people
Yoruba actresses
1969 births
People from Kwara State
Actresses in Yoruba cinema
Actresses from Ibadan
Moji
21st-century Nigerian actresses
Actresses from Kwara State
Nigerian film producers
Nigerian film directors